Henry Kilgariff Workman (February 5, 1926 – March 16, 2020) was an American professional baseball player who appeared in two games in Major League Baseball for the New York Yankees during the  season. He threw right-handed and batted left-handed. He was born in Los Angeles, California.

Workman attended the University of Southern California and was elected to the USC Athletic Hall of Fame in 2009. He was captain of the USC Trojans baseball team that won the 1948 College World Series, playing also on USC conference winners in 1946–47.  Workman's father, Tom, also lettered in baseball at USC (in 1912).

In his brief big league career, Workman played one game as a first baseman and appeared in the other as a pinch hitter. He had one hit in five at bats—a single off Harry Taylor of the Boston Red Sox on October 1, 1950—for a .200 batting average. Workman replaced future Baseball Hall of Fame member Joe DiMaggio as the fourth batter in the lineup the day he played first base. He also played six years in minor league baseball, where he was primarily an outfielder, and in Cuba during the winter of 1952–53. Workman became a lawyer after his baseball career ended.

Workman enlisted in the United States military, during World War II, in 1944 and was in the naval aviation training program when World War II ended. He went to Loyola Law School and then practiced law in Los Angeles. Workman died on March 16, 2020, in Santa Monica, California.

Workman's paternal grandfather was William H. Workman who was the mayor of Los Angeles, California from 1886 to 1888.

References

External links

Baseball-Almanac page

1926 births
2020 deaths
All-American college baseball players
Baseball players from Los Angeles
Binghamton Triplets players
Burials at Holy Cross Cemetery, Culver City
Kansas City Blues (baseball) players
Lawyers from Los Angeles
Loyola Law School alumni
Major League Baseball first basemen
Military personnel from California
New York Yankees players
Newark Bears (IL) players
San Diego Padres (minor league) players
Syracuse Chiefs players
United States Navy pilots of World War II
University of Southern California alumni
USC Trojans baseball players